Ecological selection (or environmental selection or survival selection or individual selection or asexual selection) refers to natural selection without sexual selection, i.e. strictly ecological processes that operate on a species' inherited traits without reference to mating or secondary sex characteristics.  The variant names describe varying circumstances where sexual selection is wholly suppressed as a mating factor.

Ecologists often study ecological selection when examining the abundance of individuals per population across regions, and what governs such abundances.

Circumstances in which it occurs
Ecological selection can be said to be taking place in any circumstance where inheritance of specific traits is determined by ecology alone without direct sexual competition, when e.g. sexual competition is strictly ecological or economic, there is little or no mate choice, females do not resist any male who wishes to mate, all traits will be equally propagated regardless of mating, or the species is hermaphroditic or asexually reproducing, an ecological selection is taking place. For example, environmental pressures are largely responsible for the evolution of different life history strategies between the African honey bee, A. m. scutellata, and the European honey bee.

In sexually reproducing species, it is applicable mostly to situations where ecological pressures prevent most competitors from reaching maturity, or where crowding or pair-bonding or an extreme suppression of sexual selection factors prevents the normal sexual competition rituals and selection from taking place, but which also prevent artificial selection from operating, e.g. arranged marriages, where parents rather than the young select the mate based on economic or even astrological factors, and where the sexual desires of the mated pair are often subordinated to these factors, are artificial unless wholly based on an ecological factor such as control of land which is held by their own force.

In forests, ecological selection can be witnessed involving many factors such as available sunlight, soil quality, and the surrounding biota.  During forest growth, tree seedlings in particular, are ecosystem pioneers, and different tree seedlings can often react to a number of members in their ecological community in completely different ways, thus providing a spectrum of ecological occupations.  On the other hand, adult trees can heavily impact their ecological communities, reversing the roles of ecological selection.  Elements of the soil are an extremely influential selective factor in forest growth.  Throughout time, every species of tree has evolved to grow under specific soil conditions, whether it is dependent on the pH levels, the mineral contents, or the drainage levels.  Each of these is a vehicle for ecological selection to do its work in the course of evolution.  However, ecological selection can be much more specific, not only working within species but within populations, even populations in the same region.  For example, scientists in Quebec recently examined how tree seedlings react to different nitrate levels.  What they found was that areas with higher nitrate levels contained plants that could much more efficiently metabolize nitrogen.  Such plants could perform photosynthesis and respiration at a much faster rate than their nitrogen lacking peers, and also had longer root lengths on average, giving them an evolutionary advantage for their habitat.  Nitrogen levels that are unexpectedly too high could harm some tree species, but these particular specimens created a niche for themselves, and could outcompete others around them. A site of tree growth can also be influenced by slope, rockiness, climate, and available sunlight.  Space is initially available to everything, but seedlings that can most quickly inhabit the soil and take advantage of the available nutrients are usually most successful.  Generally, one of the first factors to control which species grow best in the soil is the amount of sunlight.  Soil and water themselves are both very important (For instance, a dry hardwood such as a white oak will not grow in a swamp), but sunlight is the initial decider in forest succession.  Shade intolerant trees can immediately grow impressively.  They need the sunlight that is offered by an open canopy found in a bare environment.  Selection weeds out the seedlings that can not handle full sun, thus tall, straight trees will eventually grow and develop a full, lush canopy.  However, these behaviors will soon be reversed.  Seedlings that were once removed by ecological selection now become favored, because the shaded forest floor has become ideal for such shade tolerant species.  This is a great example of how ecological selection can create niches for different species by performing the same function with different outcomes.

Vs. sexual selection
In cases where ecological and sexual selection factors are strongly at odds, simultaneously encouraging and discouraging the same traits, it may also be important to distinguish them as sub-processes within natural selection.

For instance, Ceratogaulus, the Oligocene horned gopher, left in the fossil record a series of individuals with successively longer and longer horns, that seemed to be unrelated or maladaptive to its ecological niche.  Some modern scientists have theorized that the horns were useful or impressive in mating rituals among males (although other scientists dispute this theory, pointing out that the horns were not sexually dimorphic) and that it was an example of runaway evolution.  The species seems to have suddenly died out when horns reached approximately the body length of the animal itself, possibly because it could no longer run or evade predators—thus ecological selection seems to have ultimately trumped sexual. 

It is also important to distinguish ecological selection in cases of extreme ecological abundance, e.g. the human built environment, cities or zoos, where sexual selection must generally predominate, as there is no threat of the species or individuals losing their ecological niche.  Even in these situations, however, where survival is not in question, the variety and the quality of food, e.g. as presented by male to female monkeys in exchange for sex in some species, still influences reproduction, however it becomes a sexual selection factor. Similar phenomena can be said to exist in humans e.g. the "mail order bride" who primarily mates for economic advantage.

Differentiating ecological selection from sexual is useful especially in such extreme cases;  Above examples demonstrate exceptions rather than a typical selection in the wild.  In general, ecological selection is assumed to be the dominant process in natural selection, except in highly cognitive species that do not, or do not always, pair bond, e.g. walrus, gorilla, human.  But even in these species, one would distinguish cases where isolated populations had no real choice of mates, or where the vast majority of individuals died before sexual maturity, leaving only the ecologically selected survivor to mate—regardless of its sexual fitness under normal sexual selection processes for that species.

For example, if only a few closely related males survive a natural disaster, and all are able to mate very widely due to lack of males, sexual selection has been suppressed by an ecological selection (the disaster).  Such situations are usually temporary, characteristic of populations under extreme stress, for relatively short terms.  However, they can drastically affect populations in that short time, sometimes eliminating all individuals susceptible to a pathogen, and thereby rendering all survivors immune.  A few such catastrophic events where ecological selection predominates can lead to a population with specific advantages, e.g. in colonization when invading populations from more crowded disease-prone conditions arrive with antibodies to diseases, and the diseases themselves, which proceed to wipe out natives, clearing the way for the colonists.

In humans, the intervention of artificial devices such as ships or blankets may be enough to make some consider this an example of artificial selection.  However it is clearly observed in other species, it seems unreasonable to differentiate colonization by ship from colonization by walking, and even the word "colony" is not specific to humans but refers generically to an intrusion of one species on an ecology to which it has not wholly adapted.  So, despite the potential controversy, it may be better to consider all examples of colonist-borne diseases to be ecological selection.

For another example, in a region devastated by nuclear radiation, such as the Bikini Atoll, capacity to survive gamma rays to sexual maturity and (for the female) to term is a key ecological selection factor, although it is neither "natural" nor sexual.  Some would call this too artificial selection, not natural or ecological, as the radiation does not enter the ecology as a factor save due to man's effort.  Ambiguous artificial-plus-ecological factors may reasonably be called "environmental", and the term environmental selection may be preferable in these cases.

See also

Ecology

References

Ecological processes
Selection
Population genetics